Washington Crossing State Park is a  New Jersey state park that is part of Washington's Crossing, a U.S. National Historic Landmark area.  It is located in the Washington Crossing and Titusville sections of Hopewell Township in Mercer County, north of Trenton along the Delaware River. The park is operated and maintained by the New Jersey Division of Parks and Forestry. It is supported by the Washington Crossing Park Association, a friends group that works to preserve, enhance, and advocate for the park.

This park area, together with Washington Crossing Historic Park on the Pennsylvania side, comprise the Washington's Crossing National Historic Landmark, which was listed on January 20, 1961, and added to the National Register of Historic Places on October 15, 1966.

The Nature Center offers exhibits, displays, and educational programs for children, families and school groups. During warmer months, concerts and plays are held at the Washington Crossing Open Air Theatre, an outdoor theater with seating consisting of wooden benches.

Goat Hill Overlook, located nearby in West Amwell Township in Hunterdon County, is administered by the New Jersey Division of Parks and Forestry as part of Washington Crossing State Park.

Johnson's Ferry
The park includes the site of George Washington's crossing of the Delaware River at Johnson's Ferry. This is where George Washington and a 2,400-man detachment of the Continental Army crossed the river overnight on December 25, 1776, and into the morning of December 26, 1776, to make a surprise attack on Trenton, a move that would prove to be a turning point in the American Revolutionary War. The corresponding ferry on the Pennsylvania side of the Delaware River was known as McConkey's Ferry.

The Johnson Ferry House, an 18th-century farmhouse and tavern near the Delaware River, was owned by Garret Johnson, who operated a  plantation and a ferry service across the Delaware. It was likely used by General Washington and other officers at the time of the crossing. Several rooms are furnished with period pieces, and an 18th-century kitchen garden has been planted.  On weekends, living-history demonstrations are frequently held.

Nelson House
Built , the Nelson House, also known as the Alexander Nelson Tavern, is located near the landing site on the Delaware River and is used for park history demonstrations. The house includes period furnishings and old photographs of railroad and canal transportation.

Washington Crossing Visitor Center Museum

The Washington Crossing Visitor Center Museum focuses on the American Revolution and the military campaign known as the "Ten Crucial Days" from December 25, 1776, through January 3, 1777. During this time, the George Washington and the Continental Army crossed the Delaware River, and fought at the Battle of Trenton, the Battle of the Assunpink Creek, and the Battle of Princeton.  It features the Harry Kels Swan Collection of Revolutionary War artifacts. Over 700 military items from the American and British Armies are included in the collection. The center also includes interpretive history exhibits that cover the Revolutionary War from its prelude in 1758 to the signing of the Treaty of Paris in 1783.

Nature Center and Observatory
The Washington Crossing State Park Nature Center offers nature education programs are for schools, youth groups, community organizations, and visitors to the park. The center is open Wednesday through Sunday, year round.

Nearby is the John W. H. Simpson Observatory, which is operated by the Amateur Astronomers Association of Princeton. The observatory houses two telescopes: a 6.25-inch Hastings-Byrne refractor and a 14-inch SCT.  The observatory is open for public observing led by association volunteers on Friday nights April through October from 8 to 11 pm, weather permitting.

Goat Hill Overlook
Goat Hill Overlook is a  scenic preserve administered as part of nearby Washington Crossing State Park. The New Jersey Department of Environmental Protection's Green Acres program purchased the Goat Hill Overlook property in 2009 for $4.5 million from Constructural Dynamics Inc. of Fairless Hills, Pennsylvania. The company acquired Goat Hill Overlook from the Boy Scouts in 1983 and originally intended to use the land for mining operations. That plan was later changed in favor of constructing a residential development complex at the site. In addition to views of the Delaware River, the property features a prominent rock, known as Washington Rock. According to local legend, General Washington used the views from Goat Hill Overlook to assess battle conditions during the Revolutionary War. The site also offers miles of hiking trails and contains a variety of wildlife and plant species.

Gallery

See also

List of New Jersey state parks
National Register of Historic Places listings in Mercer County, New Jersey

References

External links

 
 
 
 Washington Crossing Open Air Theatre
 NY-NJTC: Washington Crossing State Park Trail Details and Info

American Revolutionary War sites
State parks of New Jersey
Nature centers in New Jersey
New Jersey Register of Historic Places
American Revolutionary War museums in New Jersey
Museums in Mercer County, New Jersey
Historic house museums in New Jersey
Ferries of New Jersey
Parks in Mercer County, New Jersey
Hopewell Township, Mercer County, New Jersey
American Revolution on the National Register of Historic Places
National Register of Historic Places in Mercer County, New Jersey
Conflict sites on the National Register of Historic Places in New Jersey
Historic American Buildings Survey in New Jersey
George Washington's crossing of the Delaware River